SZ, Sz, sZ, or sz may refer to:

Businesses and organizations
 Slovenske železnice (SŽ), a Slovenian railway company
 Green Party (Czech Republic)
 Air Southwest (IATA code)

Places
 Canton of Schwyz
 Shenzhen, simplify into SZ, a city in Guangdong province, China
 Eswatini (ISO 3166-1 country code)
 .sz, the country code top level domain (ccTLD) for Eswatini
 Switzerland (NATO country code)

Products
 Alfa Romeo SZ, a car
 Rolls-Royce SZ and Bentley SZ, a series of different cars produced from 1980 to 2003 by Rolls-Royce Motors and Bentley Motors
 SZ cycle-car, a Soviet/Russian microcar series including SZA and SZD
 SZ, a model from Sony's range of VAIO computers
 Sprite Zero, a diet soft drink

Publications
 Saarbrücker Zeitung, a German newspaper, based in Saarland
 Süddeutsche Zeitung, a German newspaper, published in Munich
 Szőllősy  index, catalogue (Sz) of all the compositions of Béla Bartók
 S/Z, an essay by Roland Barthes, published as a book in 1970

Science and technology
 Shenzhou (spacecraft), the Chinese space capsule
 Sunyaev–Zel'dovich effect, in astrophysics
 Suzuki groups, a family of mathematical groups
 Suzuki sporadic group, a mathematical group

Other uses
 Sz (digraph), a digraph used in Hungarian, Polish, Kashubian, German, and Cantonese romanization
 Sky Zone

See also
ß
ZS (disambiguation)